Joe James was an American racecar driver. He was born in Saucier, Mississippi and died during a Champ Car race at San Jose Speedway.

Award
He was inducted in the National Sprint Car Hall of Fame in 1997.

Legacy
Salem Speedway honored him along with Pat O'Connor with an annual title event. The 2020 event was part of the USAC Silvercrown series.

Indy 500 results

World Championship career summary
The Indianapolis 500 was part of the FIA World Championship schedule from 1950 through 1960. Drivers competing at Indy during those years were credited with World Championship points and participation. Joe James participated in 2 World Championship races but scored no World Championship points.

References

1925 births
1952 deaths
Indianapolis 500 drivers
National Sprint Car Hall of Fame inductees
People from Harrison County, Mississippi
Racing drivers from Mississippi
Racing drivers who died while racing
Sports deaths in California